U-118 may refer to one of the following German submarines:

 , a Type UE II submarine launched in 1918 that served in World War I and was surrendered in 1919
 During World War I, Germany also had this submarine with a similar name:
 , a Type UB III submarine launched in 1917 and surrendered in 1918
, a Type XB submarine that served in World War II and was sunk on 12 June 1943

Submarines of Germany